Mariana is the 1997 second novel of Katherine Vaz, originally written in English, published by Flamingo/HarperCollin. The novel was selected by the Library of Congress as one of the Top 30 International Books of 1998. The novel has been translated into more than six languages including Portuguese, Italian, and Greek.

Plot
The plot retells the seventeenth-century romance between Mariana Alcoforado, a nun at the Convent of Beja, and an officer in the French army.

References

1997 novels
Novels set in the 17th century
Novels set in Portugal